Albany Municipal Airport  is a city-owned public-use airport located two nautical miles (3.7 km) east of the central business district of Albany, a city in Shackelford County, Texas, United States.

Facilities and aircraft 
It has one runway designated 17/35 with an asphalt surface measuring 5,000 by 75 feet (1,524 x 23 m).

For the 12-month period ending June 15, 2006, the airport had 4,000 general aviation aircraft operations, an average of 10 per day. At that time there were 7 aircraft based at this airport, all single-engine.

References

External links 
  at Texas DOT airport directory
 Aerial image as of February 1995 from USGS The National Map
 
 

Airports in Texas
Buildings and structures in Shackelford County, Texas
Transportation in Shackelford County, Texas